River of Smoke (2011) is a novel by Indian novelist Amitav Ghosh. It is the second volume of the Ibis trilogy.

Synopsis
The promotional text refers to the storyline which can be summarized as follows: After the incidents on Ibis, which was caught in a storm and eventually ended up in Mauritius, but with a few passengers less, the story help in this novel begins from where it left off. From the details of the changing lives and traditions of Indian migrants in Mauritius, the novel traces the fate of other characters from Ibis and describes the opium trade in China.
The novel has a rich tapestry of characters from various cultural and geographical backgrounds whose common interest is trade with China. The plot is set in Fanqui town, a small strip of land used by foreigners to trade with local Chinese traders, a year before the first opium war.

Plot introduction
In the year 1838, three ships are caught in a raging storm in the Andaman Sea. The Anahita, owned by Bahram Moddie, a Parsi opium trader from Bombay, the Redruth, owned by Fitcher Penrose, on an expedition to collect rare species of plants from China and the Ibis (from Sea of Poppies) carrying convicts and indentured labourers. The convicts Neel Rattan, a Bengali Zamindar, and Ah Fatt, a criminal from Canton, escape from the ship along with a couple of lascars.

The story traces the lives of these principal characters in Canton. Bahram Modi, a lowly son-in-law of a rich Parsi Ship builder Rustamjee Mistrie, convinces his father in law to provide him seed capital to enter into opium trade, carries out multiple successful expeditions to China and creates considerable wealth in the process for his in-laws. However, on the sudden demise of his father-in-law, he is forced by his brothers-in-law to retire from the Export division. Bahram decides to ship a large consignment of opium to China, as he is confident that he would be able to earn a sizeable profit to buy out the Export division, in spite of a ban on trading of Opium issued by the Chinese officials. Bahram also has a son (Ah Fatt) through a Chinese boat woman, Chi Mei, unknown to his family back in Bombay.

Fitcher Penrose, a botanist, is on an expedition to China to collect rare plants. He is joined by Paulette Lambert aka Puggly, daughter of a French botanist, in his search for the rare Golden camellias. They are helped by Robin Chinnery, a fictional illiegitimate son of the English painter George Chinnery.

Neel and Ah Fatt have escaped from Ibis and they meet Bahram Moddie, Ah Fatt's father. Neel joins Bahram as his Munshi.

Does Mr. Moddie manage to sell his opium and redeem himself in spite of the Chinese government's crackdown? Does Mr. Penrose find the rare plant he is looking for? Does Neel manage to evade the long arm of the law?

Characters
Bahram Moddie - Parsi Merchant from Bombay and father of Ah Fatt
Chi Mei - A Cantonese Tanka woman who is the lover of Bahram Moddie
Ah Fatt or Framjee (Freddie) Pestonjee Moddie- Son of Bahram Moddie and Chi Mei
Neel Rattan Halder -  the Raja of Raskhali and later Munshi to Bahram Moddie
Vico - Bahram Moddie’s purser
Zadig Bey - Armenian watch maker and friend of Bahram Moddie
Fitcher Penrose - A Cornish botanist on an expedition to collect rare plants in China
Paulette Lambert - Daughter of a French botanist who accompanies Mr. Fitcher on his expedition
Robin Chinnery - Artist, Paulette’s friend and illegitimate Anglo-Indian son of George Chinnery
Commissioner Lin Zexu - The incorruptible Chinese mandarin who is appointed by the Emperor of China to put an end to opium trading

Reception

The novel has received generally positive reviews from critics. David Davidar writing in Outlook notes "Conventional wisdom has it that in the age of Twitter long striders in the world of fiction are doomed to extinction. Attention spans have dwindled, the pundits say, brevity is all, and the grand narrative is to be consigned to the trash heap. Well, thank God, Amitav Ghosh hasn’t been paying attention to the so-called experts but has decided to go where his inclinations have led him. Generous helpings of humour, adventure (the hunt for the golden camellia was a favourite), history, romance, villainy and suspense are expertly blended into the narrative to make for a rich and entertaining read".

Anjana Rajan writing in The Hindu says "To have read Sea of Poppies is no pre-condition to enjoy the second. What is perhaps a pre-condition is an appetite for detail, a taste for complexities, and a love for words and their strange journeys. Robin Chinnery's conversation transports us to Jane Austen's England. And we are charmed by the sing-song of pidgin as Chi-mei sympathises with Bahram."

Tessa Hadley in The Guardian says "In historical novels the past can sometimes feel tamed; hindsight, hovering just off the page, tells us that we know what it all added up to and what came of it (the First Opium War, during which British gunboats enforced a treaty opening Chinese ports to international trade, comes shortly after the ending of this novel). But Ghosh's novels somehow succeed in taking us back inside the chaos of when "then" was "now". His grasp of the detail of the period is exhaustive – he is so thoroughly submerged in it – that readers can't possibly remember all the things he shows them, or hold on to all the life-stories of all the characters he introduces.". She also goes on to lament "The novel feels stitched together clumsily in a few places. In particular, the section narrated in letters from Robin Chinnery (illegitimate, mixed-race and presumably fictional son of George Chinnery, a real-life painter of South China scenes) to Paulette the botanist, who appears in the previous book. Paulette is too absent and Robin feels like a contrivance to take us inside certain aspects of Canton life where Bahram can't go."

In Paste Magazine, writer Zack Shlachter calls the Ibis trilogy "one of the most inspired explorations of global encounters by a 21st-century writer," noting that in River of Smoke Ghosh focuses on the simultaneous dangers and potential—for exploitation as for more benevolent kinds of exchange—inherent in trade.

The novel has received some awards and recognition. It was shortlisted for 2011 The Hindu Literary Prize; longlisted for the 2011 Man Asian Literary Prize; and shortlisted for the 2013 DSC Prize for South Asian Literature. NPR listed the book as one of the year's best historical novels.

References

External links
Amitav Ghosh website

2011 Indian novels
Fiction set in 1838
Indian historical novels in English
Works about opium
Novels set in British India
Novels set in Guangdong
Novels set in Hong Kong
Novels set in the Qing dynasty
Novels set in Mauritius
Novels set in the 1830s
Novels set on ships
Postcolonial novels
Penguin Books India books
Novels about colonialism